Kelly M. Schulz (born January 2, 1969) is an American politician who served as the Secretary of the Maryland Department of Commerce from January 2019 to January 2022 and earlier as Secretary of the Maryland Department of Labor, Licensing, and Regulation. She served in the Maryland House of Delegates representing District 4A, Frederick County, Maryland. She ran unsuccessfully for the Republican nomination for Governor of Maryland in 2022, losing to state delegate Dan Cox.

Early life and education
Schulz was born on January 2, 1969, in Warren, Michigan. She attended college, but left at age 19 when she became pregnant. She married, had another child, and worked a series of jobs, including bartending and waiting tables. She later returned to college, attending Monroe Community College in Rochester, New York, and earning an A.A. degree in 2003. In the same year, she moved to Frederick County for her husband's job. She completed her undergraduate studies at Hood College, earning a B.A. in political science in 2006.

Career
Schulz is a former aide to Sen. David R. Brinkley and the Maryland House Republican Caucus. She also has worked for the federal government, as an appointee to the Environmental Protection Agency under President George W. Bush. Her service to the Maryland Republican Party was recognized with the Grass Roots Activist Award in 2005 and she represented Maryland at the Republican National Convention in 2008.

In the legislature
Schulz won a seat in the two-member District 4A in Frederick County by finishing first in a field of five candidates in the 2010 Maryland gubernatorial general election. In the primary election Schulz finished second, edging out incumbent Delegate Paul S. Stull by six votes. Schulz was sworn in on January 12, 2011, and was assigned to the House Economic Matters committee. She was a member of the Women Legislators of Maryland.

In 2012, Schulz filed to run as a Delegate to the Republican National Convention, representing Rick Perry. She received 2.1 percent of the vote in the Republican primary election.

Executive branch
On December 17, 2014, Governor-Elect Larry Hogan announced at a press conference that he had chosen Schulz to be his Secretary for the Department of Labor, Licensing, and Regulation. The Maryland Senate unanimously approved her nomination on February 13, 2015. She was sworn in on March 13, 2015.

As Secretary of Labor, Schulz sought to improve Maryland's image among businesses and piloted apprenticeship programs to prepare youth for STEM careers. Labor unions expressed concern with Schulz's policies, including those concerning off-the-books hiring.

On December 17, 2018, Hogan announced that Schulz would succeed Mike Gill as Maryland Secretary of Commerce. Her nomination was unanimously approved by the Maryland Senate on February 8, 2019. She was sworn in on January 9, 2019.

During her tenure at the Department of Commerce, the agency played a role in keeping businesses operating during the COVID-19 pandemic. Following the pandemic, Schulz sought to promote business through a state marketing effort called "Innovation Uncovered".

On December 30, 2021, the Hogan administration announced that Schulz would leave the administration alongside Maryland Transportation Secretary Greg Slater in order to focus on her gubernatorial campaign. Hogan named Mike Gill, her predecessor, to succeed Schulz as Secretary of Commerce effective January 11, 2022.

2022 Maryland gubernatorial candidacy

On April 14, 2021, Schulz announced that she would vie to become the state's first female governor by running to be the Republican nominee in the 2022 Maryland gubernatorial election. Her running mate was Jeff Woolford, an Air Force veteran and assistant Health secretary. She was endorsed by Hogan, who was stepping down as required by Maryland term limits.

During the primary, Schulz was noted for withdrawing from many of the candidate forums held around the state, refusing to take a stage with her main opponent Dan Cox. The Schulz campaign said this was to avoid propping up Cox, who was farther to the right than the more moderate Schulz. Cox had been endorsed by former President Donald Trump, who had criticized Governor Hogan and attacked Schulz as a RINO. The primary between Cox and Schulz was seen by election analysts as a proxy war between Hogan and Trump. The Democratic Governors Association (DGA) spent $1 million on television ads promoting Cox, believing him to be a weaker opponent in a deep blue state.

On July 19, 2022, Schulz lost the primary to Cox, earning 43.5 percent of the vote to Cox's 52.0 percent. Schulz declined to endorse Cox after conceding on July 29, predicting correctly that Democratic nominee Wes Moore would defeat him in the general election.

Jim Dornan, who worked as an on-and-off political strategist for the Schulz campaign, attributed Cox's primary victory to Trump's endorsement and the DGA ad blitz. Other observers, including former Maryland lieutenant governor and Republican National Committee chair Michael Steele, said the ads had little impact on voters. Steele noted that neo-Confederate activist Michael Peroutka won his primary to be the GOP's candidate for Maryland Attorney General by an almost identical margin to Cox without DGA ads.

Post-secretary career
In October 2022, the Maryland Tech Council announced that Schulz would serve as the trade association's CEO, beginning on November 1. In February 2023, Schulz was named as a member of the Hood College Board of Associates.

Political positions

Education
During her 2022 campaign, Schulz said that she supported school choice and advocated for keeping schools open. She also drafted a "parental bill of rights" that included promises to post classroom lessons online, expand the use of school resource officers in classrooms, make it easier to open public charter schools, increase funding for private school scholarships, and "keep partisan politics out of the classroom".

Elections
In August 2013, Schulz called for an investigation into the integrity of Maryland's elections in the state after conservative activist group True the Vote claimed to find 173 cases of interstate voter fraud in Florida.

Schulz introduced legislation in the 2014 legislative session that would allow mail voting for municipal incorporation elections.

Guns
Schulz introduced several pieces of gun-rights legislation during the 2015 legislative session before she resigned to join the Hogan administration. The first bill would have allowed licensed gun shops to instigate a National Instant Criminal Background Check and sell firearms to a person upon passing the background check. The second bill would have allowed owners of assault weapons to repair broken parts of a firearm that is registered with the Maryland State Police. The third would have changed Maryland from a may-issue to a shall-issue state. The fourth and final bill would have repealed a law that requires shell casings to be sent to the Department of State Police Crime Laboratory, which maintains a database of discharged casings to track guns that may be used in crimes.

Immigration
In January 2011, Schulz said she opposed legislation that would provide financial aid to illegal immigrants. She also said she thought the state should prevent illegal immigrants from receiving welfare benefits or social services.

Schulz opposed legislation introduced in the 2013 legislative session that would allow undocumented workers to obtain limited driver's licenses.

Labor
In 2012, Schulz worked to weaken the Workplace Fraud Act, which gave employers twice as much time to produce records and added exemptions for employers.

In December 2013, Schulz wrote an op-ed for the Frederick News-Post criticizing legislation that would raise the state's minimum wage from $7.25 to $10 per hour. She voted against the bill in the House Economic Matters Committee, which passed it, 13–8. Schulz did remove a provision from the bill that would have indexed increases of the minimum wage to inflation.

In 2017, Governor Hogan appointed Schulz to chair a committee to investigate paid-leave policy. In November, the group released a 72-page report containing its conclusions on the implementation of statewide paid-leave legislation.

In February 2019, Schulz wrote to lawmakers to urge them to consider implementing regional or county wage rates into legislation that would increase the state's minimum wage to $15 an hour.

Marijuana
During a debate on legislation that would legalize medical marijuana in Maryland, Schulz introduced an amendment that would report medical marijuana use on the state's prescription drug monitoring program. The House of Delegates rejected the amendment.

In August 2021, Schulz said that she did not have a policy position on the legalization of marijuana, but mentioned that hemp development for farmers was an important economic development opportunity.

Social issues
As a state delegate, Schulz sponsored and voted for bills that would have restricted abortion rights in Maryland, including a bill to block state funding for abortion services and proposed ballot referendum to amend the state constitution to extend the state's constitutional rights to people "from the beginning of their biological development". During her gubernatorial campaign, Schulz said that she personally opposes abortion but would not move to change current Maryland law.

In January 2012, Schulz said that she opposed same-sex marriage, and supported a grassroots movement to start a referendum to overturn same-sex marriage legislation. She voted against legislation introduced in the 2012 legislative session that would legalize same-sex marriage in Maryland.

Schulz opposes mask and vaccine mandates, saying that both should be up to the individual.

Electoral history

References

External links
Kelly Schulz - Summary - Project Vote Smart
Kelly Schulz's profile at LinkedIn

1969 births
21st-century American politicians
21st-century American women politicians
Candidates in the 2022 United States elections
Hood College alumni
Living people
Republican Party members of the Maryland House of Delegates
Monroe Community College alumni
People from Frederick County, Maryland
People from Warren, Michigan
State cabinet secretaries of Maryland
Women state legislators in Maryland